The Moka Range is a mountain range in Mauritius. It contains two of Mauritius's three tallest peaks, Pieter Both and Le Pouce. It was formed from a basalt lava dome ten million years ago. The Moka Range forms a semicircle around the capital of Mauritius, Port Louis.

References

Mountain ranges of Mauritius